is a Japanese former Nippon Professional Baseball pitcher.

References 

1969 births
Living people
Baseball people from Hiroshima Prefecture 
Japanese baseball players
Nippon Professional Baseball pitchers
Yokohama Taiyō Whales players
Yokohama BayStars players
Japanese baseball coaches
Nippon Professional Baseball coaches